The Londonderry County Asylum was a psychiatric hospital at Strand Road in Derry, County Londonderry, Northern Ireland.

History
The hospital, which was designed by Francis Johnston and William Murphy, opened as the Londonderry Asylum in 1829. It had been built at a cost of £25,678 and was intended to cater for the City of Derry and the counties of Londonderry, Donegal and Tyrone. The asylum initially provided accommodation for 104 patients but had to be extended the following year so it could accommodate 150 patients. After the patients were transferred to the new Gransha Hospital, the asylum closed in 1905.

By the mid-1960s the site had become overgrown and the remaining buildings were demolished soon after. There are local stories of tunnels running from the old infirmary (where Clarendon Manor is now located at the top of Clarendon Street/Asylum Road) that ran into the asylum. Another tunnel running from the asylum Superintendent's residence on the Northland Road to the asylum was reported to have been bricked up in the 1960s. The North West Regional College Strand Road Campus is now located on the site of the asylum.

References

Hospitals in County Londonderry
Hospital buildings completed in 1829
Hospitals established in 1829
1829 establishments in Ireland
Defunct hospitals in Northern Ireland
Hospitals disestablished in 1905
1905 disestablishments in Ireland
Demolished buildings and structures in Northern Ireland
Buildings and structures demolished in the 1960s
19th-century architecture in Northern Ireland